"i" (stylized in lowercase) is a song by American rapper Kendrick Lamar featuring Ronald Isley of The Isley Brothers. It was released on September 23, 2014 as the lead single from Lamar's third studio album To Pimp a Butterfly. The song uses music from "That Lady", written by and originally performed by R&B group The Isley Brothers, elements from which were re-recorded rather than being directly sampled from the original record. "i" won two awards at the 2015 Grammy Awards: Best Rap Performance and Best Rap Song.

Background
"i" was produced by Los Angeles producer Rahki, who also produced the song "Institutionalized". Although the version of "i" that appears on the album is drastically different from the single release, both versions contain a sample of the song "That Lady" by The Isley Brothers. Lamar personally visited Isley Brothers' lead vocalist Ronald Isley to ask his permission to sample the song: "I actually had to go to St. Louis and get the blessings from Ronald Isley," he said. "That was a trip. We got in the studio and just vibed and talked about how things were back then and how they are now, and you can actually hear him on the record with a few ad-libs that he actually did. We got it on camera and things like that, it’s a beautiful thing." Isley also performs on the song "How Much a Dollar Cost?" with singer-songwriter James Fauntleroy.

The single cover for "i" features members of gangs the Bloods and the Crips forming a heart. On the subject of the cover art Lamar said in an interview with AMP Radio: "Where I'm from, there's a lot of gang culture and things like that, so instead of throwing on up gang signs, which we used to, I put a Blood and I put a Crip together and we’re throwing up hearts...sparking the idea of some type of change through music or through me because I go back to the city now and people give me the honor and respect that, you know, this kid can change a little bit something different that’s been going on in the community."

The song's title has a significant connotation. In Hip Hop America, journalist Nelson George writes, "'i' is a powerful word in the vocabulary of the African American male," as it can be related to pride. While pride is one of the seven deadly sins, George's study explains how "this has been an invigorating source of self-empowerment," similar to the self-love Lamar preaches in his song.

Music video
The video for the song premiered on Vevo and YouTube on November 4, 2014. It features cameos from singer Ron Isley and George Clinton. References are made to 2Pac and The Joker in the video. A short instrumental was played in the intro of the clip. The video is directed by Alexandre Moors.

Critical reception and awards
"i" received critical acclaim from music critics. The track was placed at number ten on Rolling Stones 50 Best Songs of 2014 list. Billboard listed "i" as the second best song of 2014. "i" also was placed at number 14 on Spins list of "The 101 Best Songs of 2014". In January 2015, "i" was ranked at number five on The Village Voices annual year-end Pazz & Jop critics' poll.

"i" was nominated for Outstanding Music Video and Outstanding Song at the 46th NAACP Image Award. The song received two nominations at the 57th Annual Grammy Awards and won both Best Rap Performance and Best Rap Song.

 Chart performance 
The song debuted and peaked at number 39 on the Billboard Hot 100, making it his fourth top 40 hit in the US.

Usage in popular culture
The song has been used in film trailers for Top Five, Dope, How to Be Single, The Intern, and Roman J. Israel, Esq. In 2014, it was the official song for the NBA. It is featured in soundtrack for the 2018 video game Forza Horizon 4 as well.

Track listing
 Digital download'
 "i" – 3:51

Charts

Weekly charts

Year-end charts

Certifications

References

External links
 

2014 singles
Kendrick Lamar songs
Songs written by Kendrick Lamar
Interscope Records singles
Aftermath Entertainment singles
Top Dawg Entertainment singles
Songs written by Ronald Isley
Grammy Award for Best Rap Performance